The dioceses of the Church of the East are listed at:

Dioceses of the Church of the East to 1318
Dioceses of the Church of the East, 1318–1552
Dioceses of the Church of the East after 1552